The Elder Grey Meetinghouse is a historic church on Chadbourne Ridge Road in North Waterboro, Maine.  Built in 1806, it is one of Maine's oldest churches.  The building is now maintained by a preservation association, which hosts annual services each August.  The building was listed on the National Register of Historic Places in 1979.

Description and history
The Elder Grey Meetinghouse is located on the west side of Chadbourne Ridge Road in a rural part of northeastern Waterboro.  It stands on a small grassy plot, fringed by trees, with a cemetery across the street.  The building is a simple single-story wood frame structure, with a front-facing gable roof, clapboard siding, and a fieldstone foundation.  The main facade is five bays wide, with a pair of entrances set between sash windows in the outer and central bays.  The side elevations each have four sash windows.  Trim is quite simple throughout, and there is no tower.

The church was built in 1806, and originally served as a union church with a primarily Baptist affiliation. It is named for Elder James Grey, a Lyman-born pastor who served the church for main years in the first half of the 19th century. The congregation's enrollment declined by the 1880s, and the building was abandoned for a time. After a brief revival in the 1890s, it was again abandoned. Local preservationists then banded together, forming an association to preserve the structure. It now hosts an annual "pilgrimage service" each August.

See also
National Register of Historic Places listings in York County, Maine
Elder Grey Meeting House and Cemetery

References

Churches in York County, Maine
Churches on the National Register of Historic Places in Maine
Churches completed in 1806
Waterboro, Maine
National Register of Historic Places in York County, Maine